Harland Bradley Howe (February 19, 1873 – April 22, 1946) was a United States district judge of the United States District Court for the District of Vermont.

Education and career
Howe was born in St. Johnsbury, Vermont, on February 19, 1873, the son of Worcester C. Howe and Rosaline (Bradley) Howe. He was educated in Caledonia County, Vermont, and graduated from Lyndon Institute. Originally trained as a harness maker, he contracted polio which left him unable to perform such demanding physical labor. He began to study law with an attorney in Lyndonville and afterwards attended the University of Michigan Law School. Unable to continue his studies after the first year because his funds were exhausted, he returned to Vermont and set up a collection agency in the law offices of Henry C. Bates, and the fees he earned enabled him to return to school. Howe received a Bachelor of Laws from the University of Michigan Law School in 1894, passed the bar and became an attorney. He was in private practice in St. Johnsbury from 1894 to 1915. A Democrat, in 1904, he was an unsuccessful candidate for the United States House of Representatives, losing to Kittredge Haskins. He was a member of the Vermont House of Representatives in 1908. In 1912 and 1914 he was the unsuccessful Democratic candidate for Governor of Vermont, losing to Allen M. Fletcher and Charles W. Gates.

Federal judicial service
Howe was nominated by President Woodrow Wilson on February 19, 1915, to a seat on the United States District Court for the District of Vermont vacated by Judge James L. Martin. He was confirmed by the United States Senate on February 22, 1915, and received his commission the same day. He assumed senior status due to a certified disability on January 31, 1940. His service terminated on July 31, 1945, due to his retirement. He resided in Burlington during his service and remained in Burlington after his retirement.

Family
In 1900, Howe married Maybelle Jane Kelsey (1878–1916). In 1931, he married Elizabeth Crump Johnson (1880–1952). Howe was the father of four daughters.

Death
Howe died in Burlington on April 22, 1946, and was buried at St. Johnsbury Center Cemetery (also known as Centervale Cemetery).

Honors
Howe received an honorary LL.D. from Norwich University in 1930.

References

External links
 
 

1873 births
1946 deaths
University of Michigan Law School alumni
Vermont lawyers
People from St. Johnsbury, Vermont
Democratic Party members of the Vermont House of Representatives
Judges of the United States District Court for the District of Vermont
United States district court judges appointed by Woodrow Wilson
20th-century American judges